The Journal of Theoretical and Computational Acoustics is a triannual scientific journal in the field of computational acoustics, covering ocean, seismo- and aeroacoustics, as well as computational methods and supercomputing. It was established in 1993 as the Journal of Computational Acoustics and is published by World Scientific Publishing. It obtained its current name in 2018.

Abstracting and indexing
The journal is abstracted and indexed in:
Science Citation Index
CompuMath Citation Index
Current Contents/Engineering, Computing, and Technology
Mathematical Reviews
Inspec
CSA Aquatic Sciences and Fisheries Abstracts (ASFA)
CSA Oceanic Abstracts
CSA Selected Water Resources Abstracts
CSA Meteorological & Geoastrophysical Abstracts
Zentralblatt MATH

Acoustics journals
Publications established in 1993
World Scientific academic journals
English-language journals
Triannual journals